Jacqueline Sfeir (16 April 1956 – 5 April 2013) was a Palestinian expert in early childhood education. 
She worked for 18 years at the Bethlehem University
and with many local and international non-governmental organizations.  In 2001, she was appointed to a five-year term as a member of the Pontifical Council for the Laity. In 2005, she founded MaDad, an independent company that uses and develops the Holistic Integrated Approach, also referred to as holistic education,  in its work with both local and regional actors who deal and interact daily with children.  She died of cancer on 5 April 2013, at the age of 56.

Bibliography

References

Ashoka Fellow Profile

1956 births
2013 deaths
Palestinian educational theorists
Place of birth missing
Academic staff of Bethlehem University
Ashoka Fellows